The men's 200 metres event at the 1961 Summer Universiade was held at the Vasil Levski National Stadium in Sofia, Bulgaria, on 1 and September 1961.

Medalists

Results

Heats

Semifinals

Final

References

Athletics at the 1961 Summer Universiade
1961